Pterocactus tuberosus is a species of cactus in the genus Pterocactus, native to Argentina. It has gained the Royal Horticultural Society's Award of Garden Merit.

References

Opuntioideae
Endemic flora of Argentina
Plants described in 1919